Not for Hire is a 1959-1960 American TV series starring Ralph Meeker as an army investigator.

References

External links
Not for Hire at IMDb
Not for Hire at CTVA

1959 American television series debuts
1960 American television series debuts
First-run syndicated television programs in the United States